Horndog Fest is an album by the American rock music group The Dirtbombs.

Track listing
All songs written by Mick Collins, except where noted.
U.S. LP/CD release

Japan CD release (In the Red/Blues Interactions, Inc.)

4, 8, 12 and 16 are bonus tracks, taken from the 1996 7" All Geeked Up.  8 was originally titled "Infrared," 12 was "I'm Saving Myself for Nichelle Nichols (No. 3)" and 16 was "I'll Be in Trouble," and is a cover of the Temptations' 1964 hit song.

References

External links
 [ Horndog Fest] at Allmusic

1998 debut albums
The Dirtbombs albums
In the Red Records albums